Winona is an unincorporated community in Scott County, Tennessee, United States, located near the mouth of Buffalo Creek, a tributary of the New River.

History
The incident, which destroyed both the railroad bridge and the train, killed one person and injured four others.

Notes

Unincorporated communities in Scott County, Tennessee
Unincorporated communities in Tennessee